Events from the year 1967 in the United Kingdom.

Incumbents
 Monarch  – Elizabeth II
 Prime Minister – Harold Wilson (Labour)
 Parliament – 1966

Events

January
 1 January – England's 1966 World Cup winning manager Alf Ramsey received a knighthood and Captain Bobby Moore received an OBE in the New Year Honours.
 2 January – Veteran actor Charlie Chaplin opened his last film, A Countess From Hong Kong, in England.
 3 January – The stop motion children's television series Trumpton, first of the Trumptonshire trilogy, was first shown, on BBC One.
 4 January – Racing driver and motorboat racer Donald Campbell was killed in a crash on Coniston Water in the Lake District while attempting to break his own speed record.
 7 January–1 July – The television series The Forsyte Saga was first shown, on BBC Two.
 15 January – The United Kingdom entered the first round of negotiations for European Economic Community membership in Rome; on 16 January Italy announced support for the UK's EEC membership.
 18 January – Jeremy Thorpe became Leader of the Liberal Party.
 23 January – Milton Keynes, a village situated in northern Buckinghamshire, was formally designated as a new town by the government, incorporating nearby towns and villages including Bletchley and Newport Pagnell. Intended to accommodate the overspill population from London – some fifty miles away – it would become Britain's largest new town, with the area's population multiplying during the 1970s and 1980s.
 26 January – Parliament decided to nationalise 90% of the British steel industry.
 27 January – The UK, Soviet Union, and United States sign the Outer Space Treaty.
 29 January – Northern Ireland Civil Rights Association founded in Belfast.
 January – The London-set film Blowup was released in the UK.

February
 6 February – Soviet Premier Alexei Kosygin arrived in the UK for an eight-day visit. He met the Queen on 9 February.
 7 February – The British National Front was founded by A. K. Chesterton (by an amalgamation of the British National Party and League of Empire Loyalists).
 12 February – Police raided "Redlands", the Sussex home of Rolling Stones musician Keith Richards, following a tip-off from the News of the World. No immediate arrests were made, but Richards, fellow band member Mick Jagger and art dealer Robert Fraser were later charged with possession of drugs.
 25 February – Britain's second Polaris nuclear submarine, HMS Renown, was launched at Birkenhead.
 26 February – Non-league footballer Tony Allden died after being struck by lightning on the pitch when playing for Birmingham based side Highgate United in an FA Amateur Cup tie. Three others players were also struck but survived.
 27 February – The Dutch government announced support for British EEC membership.

March
 1 March – The Queen Elizabeth Hall was opened in London as a concert venue.
 4 March
 The first North Sea gas was pumped ashore at Easington, East Riding of Yorkshire.
 Queens Park Rangers became the first Football League Third Division side to win the League Cup at Wembley Stadium defeating West Bromwich Albion 3-2. It was also the first year of a one-match final in the competition, the previous six finals having been two-legged affairs.
 5 March – Journalist Polly Toynbee revealed the existence of the "Harry" letters that alleged the secret funding of Amnesty International by the British government.
 15 March – Manny Shinwell, 82, resigned as Chairman of the Parliamentary Labour Party.
 18 March – Torrey Canyon oil spill: The supertanker  ran aground between Land's End and the Scilly Isles.
 29–30 March – RAF and Fleet Air Arm planes bombed the grounded Torrey Canyon and sank it.
 9 July – Alan Ayckbourn's first major success, Relatively Speaking, had its West End opening at the Duke of York's Theatre with Richard Briers, Michael Hordern and Celia Johnson.
 31 March – At the Astoria Theatre, Finsbury Park, London, Jimi Hendrix set fire to his guitar on stage for the first time. He was taken to hospital suffering burns to his hands.

April
 2 April – A United Nations delegation arrived in Aden because of the approaching independence. They left five days later, accusing British authorities of a lack of cooperation. The British said the delegation did not contact them.
 3 April – Anguillan-born Norwell Roberts became the first black officer in London's Metropolitan Police Service.
 8 April
 1967 Grand National won by 100-1 outsider Foinavon.
 Puppet on a String performed by Sandie Shaw (music and lyrics by Bill Martin and Phil Coulter) won the Eurovision Song Contest 1967 for the UK, becoming the first English language song to win the Eurovision Song Contest.
 11 April – Tom Stoppard's tragicomedy Rosencrantz and Guildenstern Are Dead received its Old Vic premiere.
 13 April 
 Conservatives won the Greater London Council elections.
 Casino Royale, the first of two unofficial James Bond films not produced by Eon Productions, is released. A parody, it is the only film to star David Niven as James Bond.

May
 2 May – Harold Wilson announced that the United Kingdom had decided to apply for EEC membership
 5 May
 The British-designed satellite Ariel 3, the first to be developed outside the Soviet Union or United States was launched.
 The first motorway project of the year was completed when the elevated motorway section of the A57 road was officially opened (by Prime Minister Harold Wilson) to form a bypass around the south of Manchester city area. The M1 was also being expanded this month from both termini, meaning that there would now be an unbroken motorway link between North London and South Yorkshire.
 6 May – Manchester United won the Football League First Division title.
 9 May – Peter Nichols' play A Day in the Death of Joe Egg premièred at the Citizens Theatre, Glasgow.
 11 May – The United Kingdom and the Republic of Ireland officially applied for European Economic Community membership.
 14 May – The Roman Catholic Liverpool Metropolitan Cathedral of Christ the King was consecrated.
 20 May – In the first all-London FA Cup final, Tottenham Hotspur defeated Chelsea 2-1 at Wembley Stadium.
 24 May – The Royal Navy  frigate  was launched at Portsmouth Dockyard, the last ship to be built there.
 25 May
 Celtic F.C. became the first British and Northern European team to reach a European Cup final and also to win it, beating Inter Milan 2-1 in normal time with the winning goal being scored by Steve Chalmers in Lisbon, Portugal.
 Shadow Cabinet Conservative MP Enoch Powell described Britain as the "sick man of Europe" in his latest verbal attack on the Labour government.
 28 May – Sir Francis Chichester arrived in Plymouth after completing his single-handed sailing voyage around the world in his yacht, Gipsy Moth IV, in nine months and one day.
 29 May
 The first Spring Bank Holiday occurred on a fixed date of the last Monday in May, replacing the former Whitsun holiday in England and Wales.
 'Barbeque 67', a music festival, at the Tulip Bulb Auction Hall, Spalding, featured Jimi Hendrix, Cream, Pink Floyd and Zoot Money.

June
 1 June – The Beatles released Sgt. Pepper's Lonely Hearts Club Band, one of rock music's most acclaimed and influential albums.
 4 June – Stockport Air Disaster: British Midland flight G-ALHG crashed in Hopes Carr, Stockport, killing 72 passengers and crew.
 5 June – The General Post Office introduced the Machin series of definitive stamps. The Arnold Machin design will be one of the most reproduced works of art in history with approximately 320 billion copies produced.
 12 June – You Only Live Twice, the fifth main James Bond film, premieres in London.
 27 June – The first automatic cash machine (voucher-based) was installed in the office of Barclays Bank in Enfield.
 29 June – Keith Richards of The Rolling Stones was jailed for a year for possession of illegal drugs. His bandmate, Mick Jagger was sentenced to three months for the same offence.

July
 1 July – The first scheduled colour television broadcasts from six transmitters covering the main population centres in England began on BBC2 for certain programmes, the first being live coverage from the Wimbledon Championships. A full colour service (other than news programmes) began on BBC2 on 2 December.
 4 July – Parliament decriminalised private acts of consensual adult male homosexuality in England and Wales with the Sexual Offences Act.
 7 July – In the last amateur Wimbledon tennis tournament, Australian John Newcombe beat German Wilhelm P. Bungert to win the Gentlemen's Singles championship. The next day, American Billie Jean King beat Briton Ann Haydon Jones to win the Ladies' Singles championship.
 13 July – English road racing cyclist Tom Simpson died of exhaustion on the slopes of Mont Ventoux during the 13th stage of the Tour de France.
 18 July – The UK government announced the closing of their military bases in Malaysia and Singapore. Australia and the United States do not approve of this decision.
 21 July – Criminal Law Act 1967 passed, making major changes with effect from 1968.
 27 July – The Welsh Language Act allowed the use of Welsh in legal proceedings and official documents in Wales.
 28 July – The British steel industry was nationalised.
 July – Astronomers Jocelyn Bell Burnell and Antony Hewish became the first to observe a pulsar.

August
 3 August – The inquiry into the Aberfan disaster blamed the National Coal Board for the collapse of a colliery spoil tip which claimed the lives of 164 people in South Wales in October last year.
 5 August – Pink Floyd released their debut album The Piper at the Gates of Dawn.
 8 August – Dunsop Valley entered the UK Weather Records with the Highest 90-min total rainfall at 117mm. As of August 2010, this record remains.
 9 August – Playwright Joe Orton was battered to death by his lover Kenneth Halliwell (who then committed suicide) at their North London home.
 14 August – The Marine, &c., Broadcasting (Offences) Act 1967 declared participation in offshore pirate radio in the United Kingdom illegal. Wonderful Radio London broadcast from MV Galaxy off the Essex coast for the last time.
 17 August – Jimmy Hill, manager of the Coventry City team who had been promoted to the Football League First Division for the first time in their history, announced that he was leaving management to concentrate on a television career.
 27 August – The Beatles manager Brian Epstein died of an accidental overdose in London.
 28 August
 The first Late Summer Holiday occurred on a fixed date of the last Monday in August, replacing the former August Bank Holiday on the first Monday in England and Wales.
 Herbert Bowden was appointed chairman of the Independent Television Authority.

September
 2 September – Paddy Roy Bates proclaims HM Fort Roughs, a former World War II Maunsell naval fort off the Suffolk coast, as an independent sovereign state, the Principality of Sealand. 
 6 September – Myrina was launched from the slipway at Harland and Wolff in Belfast, the first supertanker and (at around 192000 DWT) largest ship built in the UK up to this date.
 9 September – Former UK Prime Minister Clement Attlee, 84, was hospitalised with an illness reported as a "minor condition".
 10 September – In a Gibraltar sovereignty referendum, only 44 out of 12,182 voters in the British Crown colony of Gibraltar supported rejoining Spain.
 20 September – The RMS Queen Elizabeth 2 (the QE2) was launched at Clydebank by Queen Elizabeth II, using the same pair of gold scissors used by her mother and grandmother to launch the Queen Elizabeth and Queen Mary respectively.
 21 September – The Conservatives gained Cambridge and Walthamstow West from Labour in by-elections.
 27 September – The  arrived in Southampton at the end of her last transatlantic crossing.
 29 September – Cult television series The Prisoner was first broadcast in the UK on ITV.
 30 September – BBC Radio completely restructured its national programming: the Light Programme was split between new national pop station Radio 1 (modelled on the successful pirate station Radio London) and Radio 2; the cultural Third Programme was rebranded as Radio 3; and the primarily-talk Home Service became Radio 4.

October
 5 October – A court in Brighton was the first in England and Wales to decide a case by majority verdict (10 to 2) of the jury.
 10 October – Simon Gray's first stage play, Wise Child, opened at the Wyndham's Theatre, London, with Alec Guinness, Gordon Jackson, Simon Ward and Cleo Sylvestre.
 11 October – Prime Minister Harold Wilson won a libel action against rock band The Move in the High Court after they depicted him in the nude in promotional material for their record Flowers in the Rain.
 25 October – The Abortion Act, passed in Parliament, legalising abortion on a number of grounds (with effect from 1968).
 30 October – British troops and Chinese demonstrators clashed on the border of China and Hong Kong during the Hong Kong Riots.

November
 November – Plowden Report (Children and their Primary Schools: A Report of the Central Advisory Council for Education (England)) published, influentially advocating a focus on student-centred learning. 
 2 November – Winnie Ewing won the Hamilton by-election, the first success for the Scottish National Party in a by-election for the Parliament of the United Kingdom.
 4 November – Iberia Airlines Flight 062 from Málaga Airport, Spain, to London Heathrow Airport descended far below the flight level assigned to it and flew into the southern slope of Blackdown Hill in West Sussex, killing all 37 on board.
 5 November – A Sunday evening express train from Hastings to London derailed in the Hither Green rail crash, killing 49 people.
 7 November
 St Pancras railway station in London was made a Grade I listed building, regarded as a landmark in the appreciation of Victorian architecture.
 Boxer Henry Cooper became the first to win three Lonsdale Belts outright.
 8 November – First BBC Local Radio station broadcast, BBC Radio Leicester.
 18 November – Movement of animals was banned in England and Wales due to a foot-and-mouth disease outbreak.
 19 November – The pound was devalued from 1 GBP = 2.80 USD to 1 GBP = 2.40 USD. Prime Minister Harold Wilson defended this decision, assuring voters that it would tackle the "root cause" of the nation's economic problems.
 27 November – President Charles de Gaulle of France again vetoed British entry into the European Economic Community.
 28 November – Horse racing events were called off due to the foot-and-mouth disease outbreak.
 30 November – British troops left Aden, which they had occupied since 1839, enabling formation of the new republic of Yemen.

December
 1 December – Tony O'Connor became the first non-White head teacher of a British school when appointed as head teacher of a Primary school in Smethwick, near Birmingham.
 5 December – The Beatles opened the Apple Shop in London.
 10 December – Ronald George Wreyford Norrish, George Porter and the German Manfred Eigen won the Nobel Prize in Chemistry "for their studies of extremely fast chemical reactions, effected by disturbing the equilibrium by means of very short pulses of energy".
 11 December – The Concorde supersonic aircraft was unveiled in Toulouse, France.
 12 December – Rolling Stones guitarist Brian Jones, 25, won a High Court appeal against a nine-month prison sentence for possessing and using cannabis. He was instead fined £1,000 and put on probation for three years.
 22 December – BBC Radio 4 panel game Just a Minute, chaired by Nicholas Parsons, was first transmitted; Parsons continued to chair the show until shortly before his death in 2020.

Undated
 First stage of Cumbernauld town centre, the main shopping centre for the designated new town of Cumbernauld, Scotland, was completed, widely accepted as the UK's first shopping mall and the world's first multi-level covered town centre.
 Parker Morris Standards became mandatory for all housing built in New Towns.
 The first Conservation area (United Kingdom) was designated, in Stamford, Lincolnshire.
 St Christopher's Hospice, the world's first purpose-built secular hospice specialising in palliative care of the terminally ill, was established in South London by Cicely Saunders with the support of Albertine Winner.
 The Passport Office moved to Newport and the Land Registry to Swansea, both in South Wales, as part of an effort to move government offices into the regions.
 Reliance Controls factory in Swindon, the last design by Team 4 (Richard Rogers, Norman Foster and their respective wives), considered the first example of High-tech architecture in the UK, was opened (demolished 1991).
 The Eel Pie Island Hotel was forced to close by the police.
 Car manufacturer Chrysler took full control of the Rootes Group.
 Ford announced the end of Anglia production and replaced it with an all-new car called the Escort, which like its predecessor will be built at Dagenham and sold all over Europe.
 Major changes were introduced to Scouting in the UK: the name of its organisation was changed from The Boy Scout Association to The Scout Association; the youngest section was renamed Cub Scouts; the Boy Scouts became the Scouts (with a new uniform including long trousers replacing shorts); and Senior Scouts (age 16–20) became Venture Scouts.

Publications
 12 October – Desmond Morris' book The Naked Ape.
 J. A. Baker's study The Peregrine.
 Agatha Christie's novel Endless Night.
 Michael Holroyd's Lytton Strachey: A Critical Biography, volume 1: The unknown years (1880–1910).
 Liverpool poets Roger McGough, Brian Patten and Adrian Henri's poetry anthology The Mersey Sound.
 Alistair MacLean's wartime thriller and screenplay Where Eagles Dare.
 Barry Unsworth's novel The Greeks Have a Word For It.
 Boy's Own Paper, founded in 1879, publishes its final issue.

Births

January – April
 4 January – Johnny Nelson, English boxer and sportscaster
 6 January – Lee Anderson, politician
 7 January 
 Nick Clegg, politician and businessman
 Mark Lamarr, British comedian and broadcast presenter
 8 January – Tom Watson, politician
 13 January – Tom Bradby, journalist and novelist
 14 January – Emily Watson, English actress
 18 January – Anjem Choudary, British Islamic activist
 21 January – Kathryn Johnson, British field hockey player
 22 January
 Nick Gillingham, British swimmer
 Olivia d'Abo, English actress
 14 February – Sir Stelios Haji-Ioannou, Greek-Cypriot-born entrepreneur, founder of easyJet
 16 February – Matthew Cottle, actor
 21 February – Neil Oliver, television presenter and archaeologist
 25 February – Ed Balls, politician
 27 February – Jonathan Ive, industrial designer
 4 March – Sam Taylor-Johnson, born Samantha Taylor-Wood, English-born film director and photographer
 11 March – John Barrowman, Scottish-born actor
 15 March – Lisa Langford, English race walker
 18 March – Miki Berenyi, British lead singer of Lush
 21 March – Adrian Chiles, radio and television presenter
 24 March – Kwame Kwei-Armah, born Ian Roberts, British theatre director
 2 April – Helen Chamberlain, British television presenter
 15 April – Frankie Poullain, British bassist (The Darkness)
 16 April – Sarah Vine, journalist
 21 April – Sharon White, businesswoman
 22 April – Sandra Douglas, British sprinter and Olympic medallist
 25 April – Tim Davie, BBC television executive
 26 April – Marianne Jean-Baptiste, British actress

May – August
 2 May – David Rocastle, English footballer (died 2001)
 4 May – Kate Garraway, English broadcaster and journalist
 10 May – Jon Ronson, Welsh-born journalist and radio presenter
 11 May – Apache Indian, English singer-songwriter and DJ
 18 May – Martin Duffy, English keyboardist (died 2022)
 20 May – Graham Brady, Conservative politician and MP for Altrincham and Sale West
 27 May
 Paul Gascoigne, English footballer
 Lou Gish, actress (died 2006)
 29 May – Noel Gallagher, British musician (Oasis)
 21 June – Tammy Miller, English field hockey player
 29 June – Carl Hester, dressage rider
 June – Ivan Noble, British journalist (died 2005)
 3 July – Katy Clark, Labour politician and trade union official, MP for North Ayrshire and Arran
 12 July 
 George Freeman, politician
 Kevin Painter, English darts player
 16 July 
 Jules De Martino, singer-songwriter and bass player 
 Brian Mitchell, Australian politician
 18 July – Paul Cornell, British television writer
 19 July – Rageh Omaar, broadcaster
 22 July
 Lauren Booth, British journalist
 Monique Javer, English tennis player
 24 July – Darren Bicknell, English cricketer
 26 July – Jason Statham, English actor
 3 August – Skin (Deborah Dyer), indie rock singer-songwriter
 15 August – Tony Hand, Scottish ice hockey player
 24 August – Michael Thomas, English footballer
 26 August – Michael Gove, Conservative politician
 28 August – Greg Clark, Conservative politician and MP for Tunbridge Wells

September – December
 1 September – Steve Pemberton, English comedy writer and performer (The League of Gentlemen)
 5 September – Jane Sixsmith, English field hockey player
 7 September – Toby Jones, British actor (Infamous)
 18 September – Tara FitzGerald, English actress
 26 September – Denise Coates, English businesswoman
 5 October
 Guy Pearce, British-born Australian-based actor
 Dorian West, Welsh-born English rugby player 
 14 October – Jason Plato, racing driver and television host
 16 October – Davina McCall, British television presenter and UK Big Brother host
 20 October – Monica Ali, British novelist
 21 October – Paul Ince, English footballer
 26 October – Douglas Alexander, Labour politician
 30 October – Gavin Rossdale, English musician
 14 November – Letitia Dean, British actress
 15 November
Wayne Harrison, English footballer (d. 2013)
Dom Joly, Lebanese-English comedian and journalist
 24 November – Shahid Malik, Labour politician
 1 December – Pipaluk, polar bear
 3 December – Stephen K. Amos, comedian
 23 December – Tim Fountain, author and playwright

Unknown dates
 Zanny Minton Beddoes, financial journalist

Deaths
 4 January – Donald Campbell, English water and land speed record seeker (born 1921)
 3 February – Joe Meek, record producer (born 1929)
 4 February – Albert Orsborn, 6th General of The Salvation Army (born 1886)
 8 February – Victor Gollancz, British publisher (born 1893)
 6 March – John Haden Badley, English author (born 1865)
 12 May – John Masefield, English poet and novelist (born 1878)
 1 June – Derek McCulloch ("Uncle Mac"), presenter for BBC children's programmes (born 1897)
 3 June – Arthur Ransome, author and journalist (born 1884)
 7 July – Vivien Leigh, English actress (born 1913)
 13 July – Tom Simpson, English road racing cyclist (born 1937)
 21 July – Basil Rathbone, actor (born 1892 in Johannesburg)
 9 August – Joe Orton, English playwright (born 1933)
 26 August – Dame Helen Gwynne-Vaughan, English botanist and mycologist (born 1879)
 27 August – Brian Epstein, English band manager (The Beatles) (born 1934)
 28 August – Maurice Elvey, English film director (born 1887)
 18 September – John Cockcroft, English physicist, Nobel Prize laureate (born 1897)
 3 October – Malcolm Sargent, English conductor (born 1895)
 7 October – Norman Angell, British politician, recipient of the Nobel Peace Prize (born 1872)
 8 October – Clement Attlee, Prime Minister of the United Kingdom (born 1893)
 9 October – Cyril Norman Hinshelwood, English chemist, Nobel Prize laureate (born 1897)
 13 November – Harriet Cohen, English pianist (born 1895)
 4 December – Daniel Jones, British phonetician (born 1881)
 26 December – Sydney Barnes, English cricketer (born 1873)

See also
 1967 in British music
 1967 in British television
 List of British films of 1967

References

 
Years of the 20th century in the United Kingdom